Juan Correa (1646–1716) was a Mexican distinguished painter of the late seventeenth and early eighteenth centuries. His years of greatest activity were from 1671 to 1716.  He was an Afro-Mexican, the son of a Mulatto or dark-skinned physician from Cádiz, Spain, and a free black woman, Pascuala de Santoyo. Correa "became one of the most prominent artists in New Spain during his lifetime, along with Cristóbal de Villalpando."  Manuel Toussaint considers Correa and Villalpando the main exponents of the Baroque style of painting in Mexico. Correa was a very productive religious painter, with two major paintings in sacristy of the Cathedral of Mexico City, one of the Immaculate Conception and the other An Allegory of the Church.  He also painted major works for the Jesuit church in Tepozotlan, Mexico (now the Museum of the Viceroyalty).  According to Toussaint, Correa is "important in achieving a new quality, in the creative impulse he expresses, and which one cannot doubt embodies the eagerness of New Spain for an art of its own, breaking away from its Spanish lineage. Here New Spain attains its own personality, unique and unmistakable." Correa was José de Ibarra's teacher.

Gallery

See also
Afro-Mexicans
Castas
Mexican art

References

Further reading
Bailey, Gauvin Alexander. ‘’Art of Colonial Latin America’’. London: Phaidon Press 2005.
Donahue Wallace, Kelly. "A Virgin of Sorrows Attributed to Juan Correa." Anales del Instituto de Investigaciones Estéticas. Vol. 23. No. 79. Universidad Nacional Autónoma de México, Instituto de Investigaciones Estéticas, 2001.
Hyman, Aaron M. "Inventing Painting: Cristóbal de Villalpando, Juan Correa, and New Spain's Transatlantic Canon." The Art Bulletin 99.2 (2017): 102-135.
Toussaint, Manuel.  ‘’Colonial Art in Mexico’’. Translated and edited by Elizabeth Wilder Weisman.  Austin: University of Texas Press 1967.

Afro-Mexican
Colonial Mexico
17th-century Mexican painters
Mexican male painters
18th-century Mexican painters
18th-century male artists
People of New Spain
Mexican painters
Religious painters
1646 births
1716 deaths